Collagen alpha-1 (XXVII) chain (COL27A1) is a protein that in humans is encoded by the COL27A1 gene.

COL27A1 is a type XXVII collagen.  It was discovered by James Pace.  This gene appears to be turned on in cartilage, the eye, and in the ear.  Type XXVII collagen is related to the "fibrillar" class of collagens and may play a role in development of the skeleton.

Fibrillar collagens, such as COL27A1, compose one of the most ancient families of extracellular matrix molecules. They form major structural elements in extracellular matrices of cartilage, skin, and tendon.

Location 
COL27A1 is located on chromosome 9 in homo sapiens specifically on spot number 32.

References

Further reading 

Collagens